The Singer Sewing Company Building is a historic building in El Paso, Texas. It was built in 1928 for the Singer Corporation on land formerly owned by Ervin H. Schwartz, Manuel Schwartz and I. Weiss. It was designed in the Spanish Colonial Revival architectural style by Trost & Trost. It has been listed on the National Register of Historic Places since September 24, 1980.

References

Buildings and structures in El Paso, Texas
Commercial buildings completed in 1928
Commercial buildings on the National Register of Historic Places in Texas
National Register of Historic Places in El Paso County, Texas
Spanish Colonial Revival architecture in Texas
Trost & Trost buildings